Kivale is a village in India, situated in the Mawal taluka of Pune district in the state of Maharashtra.

Administration
The village is administrated by a sarpanch, an elected representative who leads a gram panchayat. At the time of the 2011 Census of India, the gram panchayat governed two villages and was based at Kashal.

Demographics
At the 2011 census, the village comprised 134 households. The population was 788 (418 males and 370 females).

Air travel connectivity 
The closest airport to the village is Pune Airport.

See also
List of villages in Mawal taluka

References

Villages in Mawal taluka